Cedric Leonard Houston (born June 28, 1982) is a former American football running back of the National Football League (NFL). He was drafted by the New York Jets in the sixth round of the 2005 NFL Draft. He played college football at Tennessee.

Early years
Houston played football, basketball, baseball and track and field while at Clarendon High School in Clarendon, Arkansas. He played in the first ever U.S. Army All-American Bowl on December 30, 2000. He held the Arkansas Activities Association record for career touchdowns with 97 from 2000–2022 at Clarendon High (Now held by Pocahontas Redskin QB Connor Baker)

College career
Houston was a three-year starter at the University of Tennessee. He and Gerald Riggs, Jr. became the first players in Volunteers history to both amass 1,000 yards in the same season.

Professional career

New York Jets
The New York Jets selected Houston using their sixth round pick in the draft. Houston struggled in training camp as a thyroid condition, discovered at the NFL Combine, caused frequent fatigue issues. He was given medication to treat the condition. Heading into the season, Houston served as backup to Curtis Martin and Derrick Blaylock however, Blaylock suffered a broken right foot in October 2005 thus elevating Houston to second on the depth chart. Martin suffered a knee injury that he played through for 10 weeks before Houston replaced him as the starter on December 11.

Houston was involved in a car crash in April 2006 sustaining non-life-threatening injuries. He was later released from the hospital.

A day before the start of training camp, on July 26, 2007, Houston left the Jets for what was cited as personal reasons. It was later revealed Houston had decided to quit professional football to return to Tennessee to earn his degree. Houston remained on the Jets' reserve list the entire season and was eventually released on March 11, 2008.

References

External links

Cedric Houston at ESPN.com

1982 births
Living people
People from Monroe County, Arkansas
Players of American football from Arkansas
African-American players of American football
American football running backs
Tennessee Volunteers football players
New York Jets players
Dallas Vigilantes players
21st-century African-American sportspeople
20th-century African-American people